The following is a list of the power stations in Peru.

Coal

Gas

Hydroelectric

See also

Electricity sector in Peru
List of largest power stations in the world

References

Peru
Power stations
Power stations